Rashtrawadi Kisan Sanghatan (Nationalist Farmers Organization), a political party founded by the landlord paramilitary group Ranvir Sena, in Bihar, India. RKS was formed by the Sena in order to make it possible for it to contest elections.

See also
Akhil Bharatiya Rashtravadi Kisan Sangathan

References

Political parties in Bihar
Agrarian parties in India
Political parties with year of establishment missing